The Skeptics' Guide to the Universe: How to Know What's Really Real in a World Increasingly Full of Fake is a 2018 book meant to be an all-encompassing guide to skeptical thinking written by Steven Novella and co-authored by other hosts of The Skeptics' Guide to the Universe podcastBob Novella, Cara Santa Maria, Jay Novella, and Evan Bernstein. It also contains material from former co-host Perry DeAngelis.

About 
In 2017, Skeptical Inquirer reported that The Skeptics' Guide to the Universe was under development with an expected release in 2018. It became available for pre-order in early 2018, and was released by Grand Central Publishing on October 2, 2018. The book was written by Steven Novella and co-authored by Bob Novella, Cara Santa Maria, Jay Novella, Perry DeAngelis, and Evan Bernstein – other individuals that have served as hosts of The Skeptics' Guide to the Universe podcast.

In an interview with The European Skeptics Podcast, Jay Novella described their approach to writing the book from the "point of view of an alien species observing the earth from a skeptical perspective using critical thinking," reminiscent of the book's namesake The Hitchhiker's Guide to the Galaxy by Douglas Adams.

Reception 
The book received a favorable review from Kirkus Reviews and was a USA Today bestseller.

Publishers Weekly reviewed the book, stating:

The book was also reviewed by Rob Palmer for Skeptical Inquirer, who wrote:

Author gallery

References 

2018 non-fiction books
English-language books
Science books
Scientific skepticism
Scientific skepticism mass media
Grand Central Publishing books